The Chalk Circle Man (French: L'Homme aux cercles bleus) is a novel by French crime-writer Fred Vargas. The first of her Detective Adamsberg series, it was published in 1991.  

The novel describes the background of Adamsberg's move to Paris, the origins of his partnership with inspector Danglard, and a glimpse at his elusive relationship with Camille. Much emphasis is placed on the theme of different ways of thinking - contrasting the two policemen's distinct approaches to investigations, and indeed life. There are also a number of typical Vargas elements in the story: a pedestrian's view of the geography of Paris, independent, eccentric but effective older women, a misdirection of the apparently abnormal drawn over the deliberate actions of a killer.

A telefilm of the novel (2009) starred Jean-Hugues Anglade, Charlotte Rampling, Jacques Spiesser and Jean-Pierre Léaud.

References

1991 French novels
Novels by Fred Vargas
French mystery novels
Novels set in Paris
French novels adapted into films